Perry Buck from Windsor, Colorado is an American politician who currently serves as a County Commissioner in Weld County, Colorado. Previously, she served as a Republican member of the Colorado House of Representatives, representing District 49 from January 9, 2013, to January 13, 2021.

Education and political career 
In 1984, Buck earned a Bachelor of Arts degree in English from Pepperdine University.

In the aftermath of the 2020 presidential election, on December 7, 2020, Buck and 7 other Republicans demanded to the Speaker of the House KC Becker that a committee be formed on "election integrity" to conduct an audit of the Dominion Voting Systems used in Colorado's 2020 elections in spite of no evidence of issues. The request was rejected, with Becker criticizing it as a promotion of "debunked conspiracy theories."

Elections
2012 When District 49 incumbent Republican Representative B.J. Nikkel left the Legislature and left the seat open, Buck ran unopposed for the June 26, 2012 Republican Primary, winning with 5,857 votes, and won the November 6, 2012 General election with 28,053 votes (58.4%) against Democratic nominee James Shelton.
2020 Buck was elected to the Weld County Board of Commissioners.

Personal life 
Buck and her former husband, Ken Buck, announced their divorce Nov. 9, 2018, three days after his reelection for U.S. House of Representatives from Colorado's 4th district.

References

External links
Weld County Commissioners biography page
Official page at the Colorado General Assembly
Campaign site
 

Place of birth missing (living people)
Year of birth missing (living people)
Living people
Republican Party members of the Colorado House of Representatives
People from Windsor, Colorado
Women state legislators in Colorado
21st-century American politicians
21st-century American women politicians
County commissioners in Colorado
Spouses of American politicians